MiJiaZhuang is a small village in the Yunnan province of China. Its population comprises 104 families, mostly of Miao origin.

See also
 List of villages in China

References

Villages in Yunnan